Inoue (kanji: , historical kana orthography:  Winouhe) is the 16th most common Japanese surname. Historically, it was also romanized as Inouye, and many Japanese-descended people outside of Japan still retain this spelling. Notable people with the surname include:

, Japanese lyricist
, Japanese film director
, Japanese keyboardist, composer and producer
Alice Inoue (born 1964), American astrologer and writer
, Japanese volleyball player
, Japanese announcer
, Japanese writer and translator
, Japanese footballer
, Japanese singer
, Japanese businessman and inventor
, Japanese singer, composer and multi-instrumentist 
, Japanese rugby union player
Daniel Inouye (1924–2012), United States Senator for Hawaii and Medal of Honor recipient
Egan Inoue (born 1965), American jiu-jitsu practitioner, mixed martial artist and racquetball player
Enson Inoue (born 1967), American mixed martial artist
, Japanese founder of Toyo University, educator and philosopher
, Japanese tennis player
, Shinsengumi
, Japanese tennis player
, Japanese actress and model
, Japanese film director
, Japanese educator and first female president of Japan Women's University
, Japanese footballer
, Japanese general
Hiromitsu Inoue (born 1974), Japanese entomologist
, Japanese  and subject of the standard botanical author abbreviation "Inoue"
, Japanese entomologist
, Japanese long-distance runner
, Japanese writer and playwright
, Japanese historian
, Japanese voice actress and singer
, Japanese footballer
, Japanese footballer
, American musician
, Japanese television personality, singer, actor and comedian
, Japanese speed skater
, Japanese businessman and banker
, Japanese manga artist
, Japanese volleyball player
, Japanese politician
, Japanese diplomat
, Japanese voice actor and singer
Kazuhiro Inoue (born 1973), Japanese mixed martial artist
, Japanese baseball player
, Japanese footballer
, Japanese cyclist
, Japanese manga artist
, Japanese shogi player
, Japanese sport wrestler
, Japanese journalist and writer
, Japanese politician
, Japanese singer and voice actress
, better known as Inoran, Japanese musician
, Japanese academic, historian and writer
, Japanese sprint canoeist
, Japanese footballer
, Japanese boxer
, Japanese judoka
, Japanese volleyball player
, Japanese golfer
, Japanese statesman
, Japanese journalist
, Japanese aikidoka
, Japanese professional wrestler
Lorraine Inouye (born 1940), American politician serving in the Hawaii State Senate
Lurdes Inoue, Brazilian statistician
, Japanese tennis player
, Japanese voice actor
, Japanese golfer
, Japanese actress
, Japanese voice actress and singer
, Japanese daimyō
, Japanese actor and martial artist
, Japanese cyclist
, Japanese general
, Japanese daimyō
, Japanese daimyō
, Japanese hurdler and bobsledder
, Japanese actor and film director
, Japanese professional wrestler
, Japanese daimyō
, Japanese government official
, Japanese daimyō
, Japanese daimyō
, Japanese daimyō
Masaya Inoue (born 1973), Japanese mixed martial artist
, Japanese sport shooter
, Japanese voice actress
, Japanese singer
, Japanese writer
, Japanese tennis player
Miyako Inoue (anthropologist) (born 1962), American anthropologist
, Japanese kickboxer and mixed martial artist
Motokatsu Inoue (1918–1993), Japanese martial artist
, Japanese volleyball player
, Japanese painter
, Japanese mixed martial artist
, Japanese boxer
, Japanese Buddhist preacher and far-right activist
, Japanese video game developer
, Japanese aikidoka
, Japanese actor and voice actor
, Japanese long-distance runner
, Japanese-born American figure skater
, Japanese footballer
Ryoki Inoue (born 1946), Brazilian writer
, Japanese footballer
, better known as Kazunoko, Japanese fighting games player
, Japanese general
, Japanese cyclist
, Japanese manga artist
, Japanese pianist
, Japanese sprinter
, Japanese jazz guitarist
, Japanese politician
, Japanese photographer
, Japanese baseball player
, Japanese volleyball player
, Imperial Japanese Navy admiral
, Japanese marathon runner
, Japanese politician
, Japanese-born American biophysicist and cell biologist
, Japanese footballer
, Japanese singer
, Japanese footballer
, Japanese footballer
, Japanese volleyball player
, Japanese singer-songwriter and actress
, Japanese baseball player
, Japanese footballer
, Japanese professional wrestler
, Japanese actor
, Japanese public relations practitioner, scholar and theorist
, Japanese manga artist
, Japanese footballer
, Japanese mixed martial artist
Taki Inoue (born 1963), Japanese racing driver
, Japanese boxer
, Japanese badminton player
Tetsu Inoue, American music producer
, Japanese table tennis player
, Japanese philosopher
, Japanese sport wrestler
, Japanese triple jumper
, Japanese screenwriter
, Japanese film director and screenwriter
, Japanese idol, television personality and actress
, Japanese professional wrestler
, Japanese footballer
Wayne Inouye (born 1953), American businessman
, Japanese poet and writer
, Japanese voice actress
, a high-ranking member of Aum Shinrikyo executed for the Tokyo subway attack
, Japanese politician
, Imperial Japanese Navy officer
, Japanese sport wrestler
, Japanese singer-songwriter
, Japanese footballer
, Japanese footballer
, Japanese classical violinist
, Japanese volleyball player
, Japanese curler

Fictional characters
, a character in the anime series Vampire Princess Miyu
, a character in the anime series Lycoris Recoil
, a character in the film Azumi
, a character in the manga series Ushio and Tora
, an anthropomorphized cat created by Sony Interactive Entertainment

References

Japanese-language surnames